This is a list of fictional characters from DC Comics who are enemies of the Legion of Super-Heroes.

Legion of Super-Heroes enemies

In alphabetical order (with issue and date of debut appearance).

In other media

See also
List of Superman enemies

References

Enemies
 
Lists of DC Comics characters
Lists of DC Comics supervillains